The Kinner Airster is an American two-seat single-engined biplane designed by Bert Kinner and built by his Kinner Airplane & Motor Corporation.

Development

The Airster appeared in 1920 designed by Bert Kinner, it was a one or two seat open-cockpit single-engine biplane. The first single-seat Airster was powered by a  Lawrance L-4 radial engine. When the prototype crashed on a test flight it was rebuilt as a two-seater with a wider cockpit. One Airster named The Canary was bought by Amelia Earhart while she was learning to fly. Later production aircraft had slab-sided plywood fuselages and were powered by a variety of  engines.

In 1927  the company produced a three-seat variant powered by a  Kinner K-2 engine, with the last Airster being built in 1927. Design rights were sold to the Crown Carriage Works in 1929 who produced a version designated the Crown B-3.

Specifications

References

1920s United States civil utility aircraft
Biplanes
Single-engined tractor aircraft
Aircraft first flown in 1920